MINA.MINERVA is a 2013 short Canadian comedy written and directed by Marshall Axani, based on the story by Diana Donaldson and Marshall Axani. The film stars Jacqueline Robbins, Joyce Robbins, Jennifer Spence, Lori Triolo, Fabiola Colmenero, Mackenzie Gray and Eliza Smith. It was produced by Allude Entertainment.

Plot 

MINA.MINERVA is a journey through the tumultuous relationship of two very feisty twins. When a petty argument nearly pushes sixty-five-year-old identical twin sisters Mina and Minerva to fisticuffs, decades of unaired baggage threatens to implode their already strained relationship.

Cast 

 Jacqueline Robbins as Mina
 Joyce Robbins as Minerva
 Jennifer Spence as Robyn
 Lori Triolo as Divinity
 Fabiola Colmenero as Bev
 Mackenzie Gray as Emotional Man
 Eliza Smith as Stagette Queen

Awards and nominations

Calgary International Film Festival 2015:
 Best Short Film Nomination

Leo Awards 2015:
 Best Sound Design Nomination

Cold Reading Series 2013:
 Best Short Screenplay

External links 
 IMDB

References 

2013 films
2010s English-language films
Canadian comedy short films
2010s Canadian films